Edvinas Krungolcas (born 21 January 1973) is a retired Lithuanian modern pentathlete who won the silver medal at the 2008 Summer Olympics in Beijing, China.

On 21 January 2013 Krungolcas announced the end of his pentathlete career. Krungolcas participated as official at the 2016 Olympics.

References

Edvinas Krungolcas. ESPN.

External links

1973 births
Living people
Lithuanian male modern pentathletes
Olympic modern pentathletes of Lithuania
Olympic silver medalists for Lithuania
Modern pentathletes at the 2004 Summer Olympics
Modern pentathletes at the 2008 Summer Olympics
Olympic medalists in modern pentathlon
Sportspeople from Vilnius
Lithuanian Sportsperson of the Year winners
Medalists at the 2008 Summer Olympics
World Modern Pentathlon Championships medalists
Modern pentathlon officials
21st-century Lithuanian people